Operation: Wake Up is the fourth studio album by American singer Mike Posner, released on December 18, 2020. It is a concept album, rapped from the first-person perspective of a fictionalized version of himself. The album features a singular guest appearance from Jessie J.

Recording and release
Operation: Wake Up was recorded and written in the basement of Posner's parents' house in Detroit, where he was staying following his father's cancer diagnosis and treatment. His father succumbed to the disease in 2017. The album was released as a surprise album.

Content
Operation: Wake Up shows the mental breakdown experienced by a fictionalized Mike Posner over a 48-hour period, with Posner playing every character. Posner described the album as "a fictional story that blurs the line between reality and performance art."
 Following the introduction, where Posner insists the album be listened to in a single sitting and encourages those with mental health issues not to listen, the album begins with him staying in a rented mansion in Los Angeles, with the goal of writing songs for "other, more famous artists". He then goes to audition material for Jessie J in the studio, and plays part of an already written song for her, pretending that he just made it up. This is followed by "Weaponry", which features Jessie J. Afterwards he goes to dinner with Blackbear, who throws a party at Posner's rented mansion.

Track listing

References

2020 albums
Mike Posner albums
Rap operas